La Yesa is a small town and municipality in the comarca of Los Serranos in the Valencian Community, Spain. The name in Valencian is La Iessa, but the local language is Spanish, not Valencian.

Geography
It borders Abejuela of Aragon to the northeast.

History

The archaeological remains found in La Yesa attest to a settlement during Roman times. Alpuente and La Yesa were also coveted by the Cid, who seized the land in the late eleventh century. In the Muslim period it was part of the Taifa Kingdom of Alpuente(ninth century), being conquered by James I in 1236 and delivered to Juan de Auñón in 1238. In 1583, King Philip II of Spain granted the status of University and in 1587 it was declared an independent village.

Economy
The municipal economy revolves around agriculture and livestock. In 1611 wheat was reportedly sold for 110 sous in La Yesa. The town has a growing tourism sector on weekends and holidays, which has fueled the growth of several shops and bars. Kaolin mining and construction are the main industries.
The municipality has close ties with the neighboring municipality of Alpuente, the town of which lies to the southwest of La Yesa.

Notable landmarks
Notable hermitages include Ermita de San Juan, Ermita de San Roque, Ermita de San Sebastián (in  disrepair) and the ruined Ermita de Nª Sª de Belén. The principal church is the Iglesia de Nª Sª de los Ángeles, which was completed in 1622 in the Renaissance style with a square tower. The church was burned down in 1840 following the Carlist Wars but was subsequently reconstructed, completed in 1852. To the left of the façade, recessed, stands the sturdy bell tower of ashlar masonry. Next to the Ermita de San Roque is the Monument to the Carlists, a cross composed of parts of a machine gun on an octagonal stone. The town contains the restaurants Tejería and Cerería.

References

External links
 Official site

Yesa, La
Yesa, La